Gingen an der Fils is a municipality in the district of Göppingen in Baden-Württemberg, Germany.

Geography
The municipality (Gemeinde) of Gingen an der Fils is found in the district of Göppingen, in Baden-Württemberg, one of the 16 States of the Federal Republic of Germany. Elevation above sea level in the municipal area ranges from a high of  Normalnull (NN) to a low of  NN.

Gingen an der Fils includes the hamlet of Grünenberg as well as the ghost town Marrbach.

Geological demographics 

Source:

History 
Some time between 1382 and 1396, Gingen was sold by the County of Helfenstein to the Free Imperial City of Ulm, whose bailiff resided in the town until 1750. Gingen became a possession of the Electorate of Bavaria in 1802, but was ceded in 1810 to the Kingdom of Württemberg. In 1845, the town was connected to the growing network of railways in Europe by the construction of the Fils Valley Railway. Gingen was reassigned in 1938 to the district of Göppingen and entered a period of urban growth after World War II, nearly doubling in physical size. Since the turn of the millennium, urban sprawl has primarily been to Gingen's west.

Politics
Gingen has one borough (Ortsteil), Gingen an der Fils, and three villages: Grünenberg, Hämmelplatz, and Marren. The abandoned villages of Ferrenbronn, Liebenweiler, Marchbach, and Weschenbeuren are also found in the municipal area.

Council 
The municipal council in Gingen has 14 members. The municipal elections on May 26, 2019 led to the most recent council members.

Mayors 

 1945–1948: Kaleb Fetzer
 1948–1954: Karl Schmid
 1954–1986: Heinz Nagel
 1986–2010: Lothar Schober (parteilos)
 since 2010: Marius Hick (CDU)

Source:

Insignia

Coat of arms
Gingen an der Fils's coat of arms displays a field of white crossed by a bend sinister, in blue, with a red in the top left corner of the blazon. This pattern was devised and adopted for use by the municipal council in 1922 and refers to the river Fils and to a local church where, supposedly, the oldest surviving written document in Germany was written. The Federal Ministry of the Interior approved the coat of arms and issued a corresponding municipal flag on 5 December 1958.

Transportation
Gingen is connected to Germany's network of roadways by Bundesstraße 10 and to its system of railways by the Fils Valley Railway.

Notes

References

External links

  (in German)

Towns in Baden-Württemberg
Göppingen (district)